William Joseph "Mike" Loan (September 27, 1894 – November 12, 1966) was a Major League Baseball player for the Philadelphia Phillies. He was officially listed as standing  and weighing .

Early life
Mike Loan was born in Philadelphia, Pennsylvania, on September 27, 1894. He was a student-athlete at Villanova University, 1 of 49 from the school to play in Major League Baseball.

Baseball career
Loan got a "cup of coffee" with the Philadelphia Phillies in September 1912, appearing in a single game. He was the National League's second-youngest player that season, behind Frank O'Rourke of the Boston Braves. He was one of six players to appear at catcher for the Phillies in 1912, posting a 1.000 fielding percentage behind the plate. Appearing in the majors for the only time at age 17, he played against the St. Louis Cardinals, recording one hit, a single, in two at-bats, for a career batting average of .500. He also scored a run in his only game.

Loan later appeared in the minors, a member of the Eastern League Bridgeport Americans. In 1919, he batted .149 with 11 hits in 74 at-bats over 28 games. Two of his hits went for extra bases: one double and one triple. He slugged .189 and collected 14 total bases. In the field, he had the Americans' second-most appearances at catcher (Bill Skiff) and made 84 putouts, 24 assists and 1 error, amassing a .991 fielding percentage.

After baseball
Loan died on November 12, 1966, in Springfield, Pennsylvania, at the age of 72. He was interred at Saints Peter & Paul Cemetery in Springfield.

References

External links

1894 births
1966 deaths
Baseball players from Pennsylvania
Philadelphia Phillies players
Bridgeport Americans players
Villanova Wildcats baseball players
People from Philadelphia